Ulug Ulus or Uluγ Ulus may refer to:
 the Golden Horde
 the Mongol Empire